Frontenac is a city in St. Louis County, Missouri, United States. The population was 3,612 at the 2020 census.

The community name is inspired by the New France governor Louis de Buade de Frontenac. Benjamin and Lora Wood, who laid out the community's core called Frontenac Estates, that consisted of 26 two-acre estates, had made frequent trips to Quebec. The community still consists mostly of houses on one-acre lots. French architecture is encouraged in design.

Geography
Frontenac is located at  (38.633752, -90.417901).

Demographics

2020 census
As of the 2020 census, there were 3,612 people and 1,305 households living in the city. The racial makeup of the city was 82.6% White (81.6% non-Hispanic White), 2.3% African American, 0.1% Native American, 9.3% Asian, 0.8% from other races, and 4.8% from two or more races. Hispanic or Latino of any race were 2.6% of the population.

2010 census
As of the census of 2010, there were 3,482 people, 1,267 households, and 1,036 families living in the city. The racial makeup of the city was 90.1% White, 2.6% African American, 0.1% Native American, 5.6% Asian, 0.3% from other races, and 1.2% from two or more races. Hispanic or Latino of any race were 1.5% of the population.

There were 1,267 households, of which 34.6% had children under the age of 18 living with them, 73.3% were married couples living together, 5.4% had a female householder with no husband present, 3.0% had a male householder with no wife present, and 18.2% were non-families. 16.1% of all households were made up of individuals, and 8.6% had someone living alone who was 65 years of age or older. The average household size was 2.70 and the average family size was 3.03.

The median age in the city was 49.2 years. 24.9% of residents were under the age of 18; 5.3% were between the ages of 18 and 24; 13.1% were from 25 to 44; 35.5% were from 45 to 64; and 21.3% were 65 years of age or older. The gender makeup of the city was 47.6% male and 52.4% female.

Education
 Ladue School District, a public school district serving Frontenac.
 St. Joseph's Academy, an all-girls high school.
 Chaminade College Preparatory School, an all-boys middle and high school.
 Villa Duchesne and Oak Hill School, a Sacred Heart School for boys and girls grades JK-6 and young women grades 7-12.
 Kirkwood School District, serves parts of South Frontenac.

See also
 Plaza Frontenac

References

Cities in St. Louis County, Missouri
Cities in Missouri